The 1819 Connecticut gubernatorial election was held on April 8, 1819. Incumbent governor and Toleration Party candidate Oliver Wolcott Jr. was re-elected, winning with 86.85% of the vote.

General election

Candidates
Major candidates

Oliver Wolcott Jr., Toleration

Minor candidates

Timothy Pitkin, Federalist
John Cotton Smith Smith, Federalist

Results

References

1819
Connecticut
Gubernatorial